Richard Ward Jones (1904-1987) was a biomedical engineer and authority on physiological control systems.

Education
His BS was from the University of Minnesota, 1926. His MS in physics was from Northwestern University, 1941, under Walter S. Huxford for a thesis entitled: Discharge Across Very Small Gaps.

Career
Dick Jones worked at Northwestern University until his retirement in 1971, where he pioneered the biomedical engineering program there.

Honors
He was elected to Fellow of the IEEE in 1965, and his citation reads "For contributions in the fields of physiological control systems and biomedical engineering education."

Selected Publications by Jones
 Christina Enroth-Cugell and Richard W. Jones, "Responses of retinal ganglion cells to exponentially increasing light stimuli," Science, Vol. 134, No. 3493, pp. 1884–1885, 1961.
 Fred S. Grodins, John S. Gray, Karl R. Schroeder, Arthur L. Norins, and Richard W. Jones, "Respiratory responses to CO2 inhalation. A theoretical study of a nonlinear biological regulator," J. Appl. Physiol., Vol. 7, No. 3, pp. 283–308, 1954.
 Christina Enroth-Cugell and Richard W. Jones, "Responses of cat retinal ganglion cells to exponentially changing light intensities," J. Neurophysiol., Vol. 26, No. 6, pp. 894–907, 1963.

Books by Jones
 Richard Ward Jones, Electric Control Systems, Wiley, New York, 1953.
 Richard Ward Jones, Principles of Biological Regulation; An Introduction to Feedback Systems, Academic Press, New York, 1973, .

References 
 Past to present: a century of honors: the first one-hundred years of award winners, honorary members, past presidents, and fellows of the institute, IEEE (1984).
 Christina Enroth-Cugell, Biomedical Engineering at Northwestern University, Northwestern University .

Notes

External links 
 Chicago Sun Times obituary
 Jones in Science Magazine
 

1987 deaths
University of Minnesota alumni
Northwestern University alumni
Northwestern University faculty
Fellow Members of the IEEE
1904 births
American biomedical engineers